Richard Marlay  was Dean of Ferns from 1769 to 1787; and Bishop of Clonfert and Kilmacduagh from 1787 to 1795 when he was translated to Waterford and Lismore. He died in office on 1 July 1802.

He was the youngest surviving son of Thomas Marlay, Lord Chief Justice of Ireland, and his wife Anne Delaune, daughter of Charles Delaune. Henry Grattan, the noted statesman, was his nephew, son of his sister Mary Marlay, who married James Grattan. He was the nephew of another Church of Ireland bishop, George Marlay, Bishop of Dromore; George's branch of the family gave their name to Marlay Park. Richard's elder brother was the soldier Colonel Thomas Marlay.

He was a close friend of Samuel Johnson, and a member of the Literary  Club founded by Johnson in 1764. His father had purchased Celbridge Abbey in County Kildare, best remembered as the home of Esther Vanhomrigh, the beloved Vanessa of Jonathan Swift, in 1723, and Richard had it extensively rebuilt in the 1780s. His brother Thomas also lived here with his wife and children.

Notes

1802 deaths
Deans of Ferns
18th-century Anglican bishops in Ireland
19th-century Anglican bishops in Ireland
Bishops of Clonfert and Kilmacduagh
Bishops of Waterford and Lismore (Church of Ireland)
Year of birth unknown